Tulsi: Mathrudevobhava is a 2008 Indian Hindi language drama film. The film is directed by K. Ajay Kumar and stars Manisha Koirala and Irrfan Khan. The film is a remake of 1993 Malayalam movie Akashadoothu which was also earlier remade in Telugu as Mathru Devo Bhava, in Kannada as Karulina Koogu and in Marathi as Chimani Pakhare though the original movie they were all remake of was 1983 American movie Who Will Love My Children?.

Plot
The titular character Tulsi is married to  Suraj, a drunkard, and their four kids. One evening, while Suraj is away, his friends tries to molest Tulsi. When Suraj gets to know of it, he beats Yashpal black and blue. A furious Yashpal swears revenge. Meanwhile, Tulsi is diagnosed with blood cancer. Yashpal attacks Suraj and murders him. A distraught Tulsi decides to have her kids adopted by different families before she dies.

Cast
 Manisha Koirala as Tulsi
 Irrfan Khan as Suraj
 Sadashiv Amrapurkar as Annoying Foster Father
 Tinu Anand as Foster Father with Crooked Teeth
 Kulbhushan Kharbanda as The Guru
 Yashpal Sharma
 Anjana Mumtaz
 Sahila Chadha
 Arzoo Govitrikar as Dr.Anjali D'souza

Soundtrack 
"Aasmann Pe Rab Hoga" - Sonu Nigam
"Dena O Denewale (Nirbal Ko Bal)" - Shreya Ghoshal
"Chhoona Chhapaki" - Udit Narayan, Shreya Ghoshal
"Waqt Bewaqt Mausam Badalte" - Vinay-Tiwari
"Toote Gharonda Bikre Tinke" - Sonu Nigam
"Chale Re Kahaar Le Ke"

Critical response
Taran Adarsh of IndiaFM gave the film 1 star out of 5, writing ″Direction [K. Ajay Kumar] could've been better. Music [Vinay Tiwari] is appealing, but the non-promotion makes the effort go waste. Cinematography [Ajayan Vincent] is first-rate. The lush-green locales are a visual treat. Manisha Koirala sinks her teeth in this role and delivers a fine performance. As always, Irrfan is efficient. Yashpal Sharma is getting typecast. Veteran Vikram does a fine job. Kulbhushan Kharbanda is wasted. The film also stars Sadashiv Amrapurkar, Anjana Mumtaz, Tinnu Anand and his wife and Sahil Chadha. On the whole, TULSI has dim chances. And lack of awareness will go against it!

References

External links 
 
 

2008 films
2000s Hindi-language films
Indian drama films
Hindi remakes of Malayalam films
Indian films about cancer
2008 drama films
Hindi-language drama films